Jošanica is a village in the municipality of Foča, Republika Srpska, Bosnia and Herzegovina.

History

Monument 
The monument is dedicated to the memory of 56 Serbs who were killed on December 19, 1992. The names of the victims are on the monument. It is located in the hamlet of Hodžići in Jošanica.

References

Villages in Republika Srpska
Populated places in Foča